Soren Sorensen (born Mounir 31 July) is a Swiss-American singer-songwriter, drummer, keyboardist, record producer and radio commentator; also known as the artist Dorian Gray.

Biography

Early life
Soren was born in Geneva, Switzerland.  His professional career began as a drummer, first with progressive rock group KGB (CH) and then more famously in his country with band Alesia (CH) as a drummer-songwriter-producer. In KGB, Soren originally supplied drums and began to write songs.

Soren Sorensen's song "Mon Coeur l'aime" was performed by Kathy Leander to represent Switzerland at the Eurovision Song Contest, in 1996, which was hosted by a-ha singer Morten Harket in Oslo, Norway.

Solo career

2007: Soren decides to go solo and signs an important Publishing deal with Editors "SIDOMUSIC B. LIECHTI & Cie" for most of his songs and also signs a production deal for his solo project under the name of Dorian Gray with debut album "Hurt by the Moon". The album is co-produced and mixed by Chief Engineer Yvan Bing (Phil Collins) and mastered by Justin Shturtz at Sterling Sound NY.

Producer / songwriter

2002: Soren Sorensen (born Mounir) discovers Welsh singer Duffy on the Internet, she's 17; together they write and produce more than 50 songs under the name of Soulego. In July 2003 they perform as a duet at the Wakestock (Wales) festival.

2003: Soren writes Star Academy 4 (French "Pop Idol") Lucie Doni's 1st single, "Je suis mes pas", which remained at 57 on the French Top 100 for six weeks (Atoll Music/Sony Music Entertainment France).

2004: Soren collaborates with producer Carmen Rizzo and Jamie Muhoberac in Los Angeles on the Invisible Sun Odyssey (I.S.O.) solo project; it's a tribute to composer/producer Jeff Lynne from ELO. CDs and vinyl records of "I.S.O". are released in France for the French Nightclubs.

2004 – 2005: Soren collaborates with French talented author Jerome Attal.

2006: Soren is featured on the "BRU(i)T" compilation CD (CH) – based on an idea by Antoine Bellwald (Phil Collins) and Alban Chaperon – with an original two minutes track called "BUDDAM".

2007: Soren collaborates with French singer and superstar David Hallyday who officially supports the project Dorian Gray and becomes Dorian's stage drummer for a few concerts.

2008: Soren is the composer of the new film soundtrack "PANORAMA 08" for the "International Committee of the Red Cross" (ICRC)

Discography

1993 : Time To Tell (Alesia) – LP
1996 : "Mon cœur l'aime" (Eurosong 96) – Single
1997 : "So Much in Love" (Fullmoon) – Vinyl Single
1998 : Changer (Soren) – Demo LP
2000 : Les mots dits (Brice Parelli) – Demo LP
2001 : A Piece of Life (Reldie) – Demo LP
2003 : Koto Buki (Duffy feat, Soulego) – 47 songs demo project
2004 : Invisible Sun Odyssey (I.S.O.) – Single, Vinyl single
2004 : "Le monde danse" (Eurosong 04) – Single
2006 : Hurt by the Moon (Dorian Gray) – LP
2006 : Buddam (BRUiT compilation) – LP
2006 : "Back To Tears" (Fantastic Day, compilation UK) – Single
2006 : "Forever More"  (The Big Indie Comeback, compilation UK) – Single
2006 : "Back To Tears" / "Violent Thoughts" (The Big Bang, Compilation USA) – Singles
2006 : "Forever More" (Suisse Rock, Couleur 3 Swiss Radio compilation) – Single
2008 : Hurt by the Moon (Dorian Gray) – International LP
2008 : PANORAMA 08 (International ICRC Movie score) – Video

References

External links
Soren Mounir's official MySpace 
Soren Mounir on Musicians Page 
MoonLand Music (Productions and Publishing) 
Dorian Gray official MySpace 
Duffy feat. Soulego official MySpace 
Soulego Medley 01 
Soulego Medley 02 
Eurosong 96 
Invisible Sun Odyssey (I.S.O.) official MySpace 
ICRC Panorama08 Movie 
"Hurt by the Moon" on Amazon.com 
France 4 – Hosted by Ray Cokes 
Sébastien Vuignier about Dorian Gray on Léman Bleu TV 
Paléo Festival – « The Reason I Love » 
Dorian Gray, conquered singer David Hallyday 
Dorian Gray by Sandra Lou – Paléo Festival 2008 
Dorian Gray – Léman Bleu Report – Paléo Festival 2008 
Dorian Gray – TSR 12.45 Interview, Jan. 2007 
Dorian Gray LIVE – "I Can Be Wrong" – with David Smet-Hallyday 
Interview Dorian Gray 08 / psbmusic-live 

Year of birth missing (living people)
Living people
Swiss rock musicians
Swiss emigrants to the United States
Musicians from Geneva